Yeh Wei-tze (born 20 February 1973) is a Taiwanese professional golfer.

Yeh was born in Taipei. Representing his country as an amateur, Yeh was a member of the 1990 Eisenhower Trophy team, and then again at the 1992 tournament. He turned professional in 1994, played on the Asian Tour and was coached in his early career by pioneering Taiwanese golfer Lu Liang-Huan. In 2000, he won the European Tour co-sanctioned Benson & Hedges Malaysian Open, only the second Taiwanese player to win on that tour following Lu, who won the French Open in 1971. The win also helped Yeh to second place on the Davidoff Asian PGA Order of Merit that season.

In 2003, Yeh joined the Japan Golf Tour. He has won twice on that tour, the 2003 ANA Open and the 2006 Sega Sammy Cup.

Professional wins (5)

European Tour wins (1)

1Co-sanctioned by the Asian Tour

Japan Golf Tour wins (2)

Asian Tour wins (1)

1Co-sanctioned by the European Tour

Taiwan Tour wins (2)
2005 Taifong Open
2007 Taifong Open

Team appearances
Amateur
Eisenhower Trophy (representing Taiwan): 1990, 1992

References

External links

Taiwanese male golfers
European Tour golfers
Japan Golf Tour golfers
Asian Games medalists in golf
Asian Games silver medalists for Chinese Taipei
Golfers at the 1994 Asian Games
Medalists at the 1994 Asian Games
Sportspeople from Taipei
1973 births
Living people